Gilles Dreyfus (born 24 May 1951) is a French cardiac surgeon.

Education

Gilles Dreyfus graduated from the Medical Faculty of Paris (Paris V, CHU Broussais – Hotel Dieu). From 1978 to 1983 he was Resident in cardiac surgery at the Hôpitaux de Paris, where he was trained in adult and congenital cardiac surgery guided by Professors Binet, Dubost, Guilmet and Neveux.

From October 1983 to 1987, he was the Chef de Clinique for Professor Alain Carpentier, senior resident and staff surgeon at the Broussais Hospital. From 1987 to 1989, he was Consultant surgeon of the Hôpitaux de Paris, working with Professor Carpentier. In 1983, he trained for 6 months at the University of Stanford to specialize in heart and lung transplantation with Professor N.Shumway. Back in Paris, he started a transplant program at the Broussais Hospital, in the department headed by Professor Carpentier.

In 1989 he became Professor of Cardio-vascular Surgery.

Career

Broussais Hospital, 1983-1989
Gilles Dreyfus started as senior resident/assistant surgeon, before becoming staff surgeon of Professor Carpentier. He acquired a specific training in mitral valve repair and developed new surgical techniques in valve repair with Professor Carpentier, in particular he performed the first mitral valve repair in case of acute endocarditis and he published an article on innovative surgical procedures. He also improved the transplant program at the Broussais Hospital, started by Professor Dubost and discontinued after 4 patients. The program developed rapidly: from 1984 to 1989, more than 200 heart transplants were performed at the Broussais Hospital. An artificial heart project as a bridge to transplant was also developed.

In 1986, he helped Professor Carpentier perform the first artificial heart implant in Europe. During his stay at the Broussais Hospital, Gilles Dreyfus published several articles on heart transplant, such as Total orthotopic heart transplant: an alternative to the standard technique (Annals of Thoracic Surgery 1991), where he described a new technique called total heart transplant.

He was nominated Professor of Cardiovascular Surgery in 1989 by Professor Alain Carpentier.

Foch Hospital, 1989-2001
In November 1989, Gilles Dreyfus became staff surgeon of Professor Daniel Guilmet at the Foch Hospital and Professor of Cardiovascular surgery. He performed more than 500 mitral valve repairs and described new repair techniques such as the papillary muscle repositioning for anterior leaflet and posterior commissural prolapse. He also improved the heart transplant program, from 10 to 25 cases per year, so that the Foch Hospital became the 2nd-3rd most active center in the region of Île-de-France.

Gilles Dreyfus continued the research on artificial hearts as a bridge to transplant, implanting TCI and NOVACOR for the first time in France. In 1998, after Professor Guilmet’s retirement, Gilles Dreyfus became chief  of cardiac and vascular surgery of the Foch Hospital, continuing the surgical activity and developing the heart valve repair surgery, the ventricular assist devices and heart transplant programs.

In 2000, French actor Gérard Depardieu underwent coronary artery bypass surgery performed by Professor Dreyfus.

London : Royal Brompton and Harefield, NHS Trust, 2001-2009
In April 2001, Gilles Dreyfus joined Professor Sir Magdi Yacoub at the Harefield Hospital in London, UK. They worked together for 6 months before Professor Dreyfus became director of the cardio-thoracic surgery in October 2001, following Sir Yacoub’s retirement. He was nominated Professor of cardio-thoracic surgery at the Imperial College School of Medicine (2nd University of UK) and then became director of the cardio-thoracic surgery and transplantation at the Harefield Hospital. He also continued his research on mitral valve surgery and on tricuspid valve.

In 2003, he presented a research paper at the AATS annual meeting with a study population of 311 patients, divided in two subgroups: one underwent isolated mitral valve repair, the other mitral valve repair associated to tricuspid valve repair. In this research, professor Dreyfus demonstrated the rationale in treating the tricuspid annulus dilation independently from the presence of tricuspid regurgitation. This principle influenced the guidelines of the international societies of Cardiology, may it be the American College of Cardiology /  American Heart Association, or the European Society of Cardiology.

He also focused his research on a new technique to replace the aortic valve, using autologous pericardium. Results of this method, called Cardiomend were presented at the American Society of Thoracic Surgeons annual meeting in 2001 and were the object of two articles.

As Director of one of the largest centers for transplantation in Europe, he led a program of heart and lung transplant and cardiac assist devices. Under his influence, the Harefield group was the first group in Europe to implant the Jarvik 2000, in addition to other assist devices as destination therapy or as bridge-to-recovery in case of heart failure.

While practicing in London, he operated the Queen of Spain's brother, the Queen of England's cousin, the King Constantin of Greece.

In 2002, professor Dreyfus, along with three other famous European surgeons specialized in mitral valve repair, developed the Master of Valve Repair, a training course supported by Edwards Lifesciences, happening twice or thrice a year, where more than 2000 European surgeons have been trained to advanced techniques in mitral valve repair.

Cardio-Thoracic Centre in Monaco
In January 2010, upon the request of Professor Vincent Dor, Gilles Dreyfus was appointed as Medical Director or the Cardio-Thoracic Centre in Monaco, taking over Professor Dor who retired.

Awards and honours
 Knight of the Legion d’Honneur (2001)

References

Further reading 
 http://news.bbc.co.uk/2/hi/health/3330251.stm

External links
 Official website

Living people
French surgeons
Academic staff of the University of Paris
1951 births
Recipients of the Legion of Honour